Desmond Mullen (born August 1, 1966) is an American producer, director, actor, and writer. He is best known as the narrator and the voice of the puppet Pig in The Busy Little Engine series of DVDs. His ex-wife, Helena Mullen, is a producer whose credits include "Superstar: The Life and Times of Andy Warhol".

Mullen started off as a sound designer in Off-Broadway theater but later moved on to television, working as a production assistant for Comedy Central (then known as The Comedy Channel) and eventually, technical director under effects director Scott Squires at Industrial Light & Magic for Paul McCartney's 1991 music video, "Off the Ground". Starting in 2000, Mullen was a Show Producer at Morehead Planetarium and Science Center where he helped create science education shows including "Magic Tree House: Space Adventure". by Will Osborne and Mary Pope Osborne. (Mary's dog, Mr. Bezo, loves Mullen's "Busy Little Engine" DVD.) Currently, Mullen is creative director, "Illuminating the workings of the world for young children" at Busy Little Studios.

Personal background
Desmond Mullen was born in Tampa, Florida. His father, John O'Keefe Mullen, Sr., was a businessman and engineer who developed the first plastic-lined paper cup in 1956. His mother, Ann, a gifted artist and musician, had her hands full raising five kids.

Mullen attended the University of South Florida in Tampa, Florida, and studied technical theater and electronic music.

References

External links
 

1966 births
University of South Florida alumni
Living people
People from Tampa, Florida
Film directors from Florida
Television producers from Florida